JSC Tulamashzavod also known as Tula Machine-Building Plant is a company based in Tula, Russia. During the Soviet era it was known for its production of weapons and motorcycles. It is part of High Precision Systems, a Rostec company.

Tulamashzavod was established in 1879. It is a major producer of guns and missiles for land, air, and naval forces. It is also a large producer of civilian motorscooters, of which it built 97,000 in 1989. It has two design bureaus, one for civilian, and another for military goods. The Machine-Building Plant is adjacent to the Tula Arms Plant. Plants in Tula work closely with the Tula Scientific Research Technological Institute (TNITI), which conducts research on the use of steel alloys in weapons which are in mass production. It was privatized in 1992.

Products
 30 mm automatic cannon 2A42
 Afanasev Makarov AM-23
 Rikhter R-23
 AK-630
 Kashtan CIWS
 Muravey (scooter)

References

External links
 Official website
 

Manufacturing companies of Russia
Companies based in Tula Oblast
High Precision Systems
Companies established in 1879
Motorcycle manufacturers of Russia
Defence companies of the Soviet Union
Motorcycle manufacturers of the Soviet Union
Ministry of the Defense Industry (Soviet Union)
Vehicle manufacturing companies established in 1879